The Suzuki DR200SE is an entry-level dual-sport motorcycle built by Suzuki. 

Introduced in 1996 the DR200SE was a derivative of the DR200 and has remained mostly unchanged until production stopped in 2013 with the introduction of the DR200S which is essentially the same bike mechanically with a few minor upgrades to the seat and the plastics. 
This lightweight, low-cost motorcycle is often used by the Motorcycle Safety Foundation to teach beginners how to ride.  It has a four-stroke,  single-cylinder engine and can be ridden offroad or licensed for street use in the United States. It has a five-speed transmission and push-button start with electronic-ignition. Some models outside the United States have a kickstart, handguard, left and right side stand, oil radiator, front luggage carrier-headlight guard and rear luggage carrier.

References

External links

Australian DR200SE Trojan
Official Suzuki Site for the 2013 DR200SE
Motorcycle USA Review in 2009

DR200SE
Dual-sport motorcycles